Clive John "Benji" Webbe (born 11 March 1967) is a Welsh singer, best known as the lead vocalist and synthesizer player for the reggae metal band Skindred. Aside from his main project, he is also active in Diamond Spider, Dub War, Mass Mental and his own solo project. He has featured on albums by Bullet for My Valentine and Soulfly.

Webbe is a native of Newport, South Wales, and a veteran of the rock explosion of the mid-1990s which led to Spin magazine dubbing Newport as 'The New Seattle'.

Early life
Benji Webbe was born Clive John Webbe on 11 March 1967 in Newport to Jamaican immigrant parents. Webbe's father was brought to the UK on the Windrush ship which brought one of the first groups of West Indian immigrants to the United Kingdom. Webbe's father arrived in Manchester where he struggled to find a job and moved to Wales instead.

He became an orphan at the age of 13 and was raised by his older brother in Newport.

Career
Webbe first came to prominence with Dub War, releasing two studio albums, Pain and Wrongside of Beautiful. A third album was in the works before the band split in 1999. Benji left Earache after they refused to let him record a solo album, which was intended to move to a more hip-hop sound. After a short lived project with Robert Trujillo, Mass Mental, which released one studio and one live album, Webbe formed Skindred with former members of Dub War. Due to a dispute with the record label, a new lineup moved to Bieler Bros. and has released six studio albums.

In 2006, Webbe performed  with Korn at the 2006 Download Festival, while Korn's lead singer Jonathan Davis was seriously ill, he sang A.D.I.D.A.S. He has also appeared on Bullet For My Valentine's 2008 album Scream Aim Fire (on "Take It Out on Me"), as well as Soulfly's debut album (on "Quilombo" and "Prejudice").

In 2012, Webbe collaborated with the rap metal band Dirty Wormz on their album Outbreak, appearing on the song "Blood & Fire".

In 2015, Webbe released his debut solo album, a purely reggae album entitled I Haven't Been Nicking in Ages, produced by Monsta Boy. He has also been performing intermittently with the reformed Mass Mental and in 2015, Dub War.

In 2018, commemorating Black History Month in the United Kingdom, Webbe was included on a list of 100 "Brilliant, Black and Welsh" people.

In 2020, Webbe unveiled a new studio project with Dub War bassist Richie Glover, entitled Diamond Spider. The "voodoo blues" project released its debut single in October that year, with a self-titled album due in 2021 along with Dub War's fourth studio album.

Discography

Solo discography

Skindred discography

Dub War discography

Diamond Spider discography

Mass Mental? discography

Collaborations

Personal life 
Webbe has four children with his ex wife and 17 grandchildren. On September 1st 2022, Webbe married his wife Julie Christian in a private wedding ceremony.

References

Skindred
1967 births
Living people
21st-century Black British male singers
Welsh male singers
People from Newport, Wales
British heavy metal singers
Welsh people of Jamaican descent
Black British rock musicians
Reggae rock musicians
Nu metal singers
Mass Mental members